Meera Deepak Yadav is a former Member of the Legislative Assembly of Niwari, India. She represented the Niwari constituency of Madhya Pradesh and she is a member of the Samajwadi Party political party.

Early life and education

Political career

See also 
Anil Jain

References

External links
 Niwari (Vidhan Sabha constituency)
 http://ceomadhyapradesh.nic.in/OtherLinks/Election_Result_2008.pdf
 http://ceomadhyapradesh.nic.in/INDEX-2008/SuccessfulCandidates.pdf

Samajwadi Party politicians
Madhya Pradesh MLAs 2008–2013
People from Chhatarpur district
Living people
Year of birth missing (living people)
People from Niwari district
Samajwadi Party politicians from Madhya Pradesh